De Koninck Brewery (Brouwerij De Koninck) is a Belgian brewery founded in 1833  and based in Antwerp. The glass in which De Koninck's flagship beer is served is called a bolleke, although this term is most colloquially used to refer to a glass filled with the beer itself and is the way the beer is ordered in bars.

The brewery is known for its flagship beer, De Koninck, which is a pale ale that is brewed using a blend of Belgian malts, hops and yeast. The brewery also produces other beers like "Bolleke", "Blonde" and "Bob". The brewery uses traditional Belgian brewing methods, including open fermentation and aging the beer in oak casks. The brewery is also a popular tourist destination, and offers tours of the brewery and tastings of its beers.

Beers
 
The brewery currently brews three beers:
 De Koninck, 5% ABV
 Triple d'Anvers, 8% ABV
 Winterkoninck, 6.5% ABV, a seasonal brew

In the past the brewery has brewed several beers, for which the production has now been discontinued:
 Cuvee Antwerpen '93, introduced in 1993 when the brewery's home city was cultural capital of Europe, 8% ABV
 Cuvee De Koninck, the commercial prolongation of the Cuvee Antwerpen '93, 8% ABV
 Antoon, a special beer introduced for the Anthony van Dyck year in 1999, 6% ABV
 Begyn, introduced for the Béguinage Festival in Hoogstraten in 1999, 6.5% ABV
 Pagadder, 6.5% ABV
 Zomerkoninck, a seasonal brew with strawberries, introduced in 2007 for the Dutch market exclusively, 6% ABV
 Gusto Golden Blond, 8% ABV
 Gusto Ruby Red, 8% ABV
 De Koninck Blond, 6% ABV

History
 
At the edge of the city of Antwerp, along the road to Mechelen, there was an inn 'De Plaisante Hof' (The Merry Garden). Despite the pleasant name, the inn was situated right across from the notorious gallows field (now King Albert Park) where, in the Middle Ages, murderers and other criminals were hanged. On this boundary between Antwerp and Berchem, in front of De Plaisante Hof, stood a stone boundary post showing a put-up hand which was token for the merchants entering the town to pay toll.  This 'toll hand' now shows on the green right-side escutcheon of the De Koninck Brewery. These days, you can still admire it in the brewery itself. The hand is also recognized as the symbol of the city of Antwerp, whose name is (according to some) derived from the Dutch for 'hand'.

On June 26, 1827, Joseph Henricus De Koninck, then husband to Elisabeth Cop, bought De Plaisante Hof. However, he died soon afterwards and his widow who then remarried Johannes Vervliet who bought back the goods from the inheritance in 1833. At that time Belgium was barely three years old (created in 1830). He turned the inn into a brewery which he named 'De Hand' (The Hand), after the toll sign mentioned earlier.

By the time Johannes Vervliet died in 1845, the brewery's name was successful and its beer had become well known. 

The name De Koninck appeared for the first time with Vervliet's stepson, Carolus De Koninck, who continued the business. When he died in 1883, he was succeeded by his son François Joseph, and later by his daughter Josephina Joanna, as head of the family business. Sales were consistently good and the barley-based beer had become the most popular drink in the city of Antwerp.

In 1912, the family business at the corner of the Mechelsesteenweg and the Boomgaardstraat was changed into a Limited Liability Company, Brewery Charles De Koninck, with Josephina De Koninck as principal shareholder. Florent Van Bauwel was appointed executive. According to the brewery's records, Van Bouwel applied himself so well, especially during the First World War, that Miss De Koninck favored him to take over the company. In 1919, Van Bouwel entered into a partnership with the Van den Bogaerts of Willebroek. Later, Florent Van Bauwel and Joseph Van den Bogaert were succeeded by their sons Joseph Van Bauwel and Modeste Van den Bogaert. Dominique and Bernard Van den Bogaert, sons of Modeste, continued leading the brewery after his death. In 2010, the brewery was sold to the Duvel Moortgat Brewery but still acts as an autonomous brand within the group.

References

External links 

Brouwerij De Koninck  Brewery details from BeerTourism.com

Breweries of Flanders
Companies based in Antwerp